The 1936 Liège–Bastogne–Liège was the 26th edition of the Liège–Bastogne–Liège cycle race and was held on 26 April 1936. The race started and finished in Liège. The race was won by Albert Beckaert.

General classification

References

1936
1936 in Belgian sport